is the second extended play by Japanese electropop singer Immi. It was released virtually on March 12, 2008 by indie label Grand Trax.

Music video
The music video of "Klaxon" was directed by French director Ai-HZ.

Track listing

Charts

References

2008 EPs